Susan M. Campbell, Ph.D. (born July 16, 1941) is an American self-help author, best known for her book Getting Real.

Biography 
Campbell earned her Ph.D. in psychology from the University of Massachusetts in 1967, and remained a member of the school's graduate faculty until 1977, she  then joined  Saybrook University in San Francisco  where she held an adjunct faculty appointment.
She was also on the faculty at the International University of Professional Studies.
Since 1967 she pursued a career as a professional speaker and a consultant and trainer.  She is also President of Getting Real Resources, a coaching and training company.

Campbell's work has been featured in magazines including New Woman, Psychology Today, Self, Harvard Business Review, Seventeen, Men's Health, New Age, Fast Company, and Yoga Journal, and she has been a guest on national TV talk shows such as Dr. Dean Edell, CNNs NewsNight, and Good Morning America, and has guest lectured at the Harvard, Stanford, and UCLA business schools.

Getting Real 
Campbell's most recent work, described in the best-selling book Getting Real and her more recent Truth in Dating, and Saying What's Real,  centers on using honest communication for personal healing and expanded self-awareness. The roots of this work are in Buddhist psychology, Gestalt Therapy, Sensory Awareness, Psychoanalysis, and Jungian psychology.

Published works

Books
 Expanding Your Teaching Potential: Education for Participation in a Changing World (Irvington, 1977)
 The Couple’s Journey: Intimacy as a Path to Wholeness (Impact, 1980)
 Beyond the Power Struggle: Dealing with Conflict in Love and Work (Impact, 1984)
 From Chaos to Confidence: Survival Strategies for the New Workplace (Simon & Schuster, 1995)
 Getting Real: 10 Truth Skills You Need to Live an Authentic Life (New World Library, 2001)
 The Everything Great Sex Book, Campbell, Susan, and Heumann, Suzie. (Adams Media, 2002)
 Truth in Dating: Finding Love by Getting Real (New World Library, 2002)
 Saying What’s Real: Seven Keys to Authentic Communication and Relationship Success (New World Library, 2003)

Articles (in juried professional journals)

 Anderson, Susan Campbell. "Effects of confrontation by high- and low-functioning therapists." Journal of Counseling Psychology, 16(5) 1968.
 Anderson, Susan Campbell, and Jules Zimmer. “Dimensions of positive regard and empathy.” Journal of Counseling Psychology, 15(5), 1968.
Campbell, Susan. “Women and Success,” The Humanistic Psychology Institute Review, 1 (1) Summer 1978.
Carkhuff, Robert, Susan Campbell Anderson and Mae Alixik, “Do We have a Theory of Vocational Choice?” The Personnel and Guidance Journal, 46(4) 1967.
Campbell, Susan. “Developing Ego-Strength in Drug-Dependent Persons Using Group Therapy,” Correctional Psychologist, 4, Fall 1971.
Campbell, Susan. “Working through the Impasse in Self and Society: Gestalt Therapy Applications in Personal and Community Development,” The Gestalt Therapist, 11(1) Fall 1975.
Campbell, Susan. “Working Through the Power-Vulnerability Polarity.” Journal of Contemporary Psychotherapy, 8 (2), 1977.
Campbell, Susan. “The Co-Creative Teacher: A Key Dimension in Accelerated Learning.” Journal of Suggestive-Accelerative Learning and Teaching, 5(1) Spring 1980.

External links
 Official Website of Susan Campbell

References

Living people
1941 births
American self-help writers
Relationship education